is a Japanese former footballer who plays as a midfielder.

Club career 

Akio Yoshida enter Tokai University from Buso Junior and Senior High School at Yokohama, Kanagawa Prefecture. He was captain of soccer team in college. He was left in 2009 due to surgery for a knee injury, but joined to Arte Takasaki in 2010. He left from the club in 2010 after a season at Takasaki.

In 2011, Akio Yoshida move to YSCC Yokohama in his hometown of Kanagawa Prefecture. In 2014, he signed a professional contract with the club and scored 10 goals in J3. He was captain for two seasons in 2014.

On 30 December 2022, Yoshida announcement officially retirement from football after 13 years from professional career with Arte Takasaki and YSCC Yokohama from 2010 and 2011 respectively.

Personal life 

He was captain of the J3 team, YSCC Yokohama.

Yoshida is most appearances is 251 games in J3 League since 2014.

Career statistics 

.

Club

References

External links
 Profile on YSCC 

 Profile J.League official site 

1986 births
Living people
Tokai University alumni
Association football people from Kanagawa Prefecture
Japanese footballers
J3 League players
Japan Football League players
Arte Takasaki players
YSCC Yokohama players
Association football midfielders